Van Cleef is a Dutch surname. Notable people with the surname include:

Jan Van Cleef (1646-1716), Flemish painter
Joos van Cleve (also spelled Jos van Cleef) (1485-1540), painter from Cleves
Cornelius van Cleve (1520-1567), painter and son of Joos
Lee Van Cleef (1925-1989), American film actor who primarily starred in westerns
June Van Cleef (born 1941), American photographer
Nathan van Cleef, one of the villains of Shanghai Noon (modeled after Lee Van Cleef)

See also
Van Cleef & Arpels, French jewelry house

Surnames of Dutch origin